Raja Rashid Hafeez is a Pakistani politician who was the Provincial Minister of Punjab for Literacy and Non Formal Basic Education, in office from 27 August 2018 till April 2022. He had been a member of the Provincial Assembly of the Punjab from August 2018 till January 2023. Previously, he was a Member of the Provincial Assembly of Punjab from 2002 to 2007 and again from May 2013 to May 2018.

Early life and education
He was born on 24 October 1976 in Rawalpindi.

He has a degree of Bachelor of Arts which he obtained from Government College Asghar Mall Rawalpindi.

Political career
He was elected to the Provincial Assembly of the Punjab as a candidate of Pakistan Muslim League (Q) (PML-Q) from Constituency PP-11 (Rawalpindi-XI) in 2002 Pakistani general election. He received 15,532 votes and defeated a candidate of Pakistan Peoples Party (PPP). From 2002 to 2007, he served as Parliamentary Secretary for Local Government and Rural Development.

He ran for the seat of the Provincial Assembly of the Punjab as a candidate of PML-Q from Constituency PP-11 (Rawalpindi-XI) in 2008 Pakistani general election, but was unsuccessful. He received 11,578 votes and lost the seat to Zia Ullah Shah, a candidate of Pakistan Muslim League (N).

He was re-elected to the Provincial Assembly of the Punjab as a candidate of Pakistan Tehreek-e-Insaf (PTI) from Constituency PP-11 (Rawalpindi-XI) in 2013 Pakistani general election.

He was re-elected to the Provincial Assembly of the Punjab as a candidate of PTI from Constituency PP-16 (Rawalpindi-XI) in 2018 Pakistani general election.

On 27 August 2018, he was inducted into the provincial Punjab cabinet of Chief Minister Sardar Usman Buzdar. On 6 September 2018, he was appointed as Provincial Minister of Punjab for Literacy and Non Formal Basic Education.

References

Living people
Punjab MPAs 2013–2018
Punjab MPAs 2002–2007
1976 births
Pakistan Tehreek-e-Insaf MPAs (Punjab)
Pakistan Muslim League (Q) MPAs (Punjab)
Punjab MPAs 2018–2023
Provincial ministers of Punjab